is a passenger railway station located in the city of Isumi, Chiba Prefecture Japan, operated by the East Japan Railway Company (JR East).

Lines

Station layout
Mikado Station has a single side platform connected to a station building constructed out of two modified freight containers. The platform is short, and can handle trains with a maximum length of eight cars.

Platform

History
Mikado Station was opened on 16 August 1903 as a freight station on the Bōsō Railway. Scheduled passenger operations began from 14 January 1905. On 1 September 1907, the Bōsō Railway was nationalized and became part of the Japanese Government Railways, which was transformed into the Japan National Railways (JNR) after World War II. Freight operations were discontinued on October 1, 1962. The station has been unattended since 1 July 1972. In 1985, the station building was torn down, and replaced by a modified freight container. The station was absorbed into the JR East network upon the privatization of the Japan National Railways on 1 April 1987. The station building burned down on November 30, 2005 and was replaced by the current structure.

Passenger statistics
In fiscal 2006, the station was used by an average of 123 passengers daily.

Surrounding area
 
Kiyomizu-dera (Isumi, Chiba)

See also
 List of railway stations in Japan

References

External links

 JR East Station information 

Railway stations in Japan opened in 1905
Railway stations in Chiba Prefecture
Sotobō Line
Isumi